The Delhi football team is an Indian football team representing Delhi in Indian state football competitions including the Santosh Trophy. Selection is mostly done through Delhi Football League system. 

They have appeared in the Santosh Trophy finals twice, and have won the trophy only once, in 1944-45.

Most recently, a 20-member Delhi football team in the final round of the 69th Senior National Football Championship for Santosh Trophy, that held at Jalandhar and Ludhiana from 1 to 15 March.

Honours
 Santosh Trophy
 Winners (1): 1944–45
 Runners-up (1): 1941–42
 B.C. Roy Trophy
 Winners (2): 1962–63, 1964–65

References

Football in Delhi
Santosh Trophy teams